Cologne is a city in Germany.

Cologne may also refer to:

Places

France
 Cologne, Gers, a commune in the Département of Gers

Germany
 Cologne (region), a governmental district of North Rhine-Westphalia
 Electorate of Cologne, a state and electorate until 1803
 Free Imperial City of Cologne, within the Holy Roman Empire 1475–1796

Italy
 Cologne, Lombardy, a commune in the Province of Brescia

United States
 Cologne, Minnesota, a city
 Cologne, New Jersey, an unincorporated community
 Cologne, Virginia, an unincorporated community

Arts and entertainment
 Cologne (Ranma ½), a character in the Japanese Ranma ½ manga series
 Cologne: From the Diary of Ray and Esther, a 1939 American short documentary film
 "Cologne", a 2008 song by Ben Folds from Way to Normal
 "Cologne", a 2015 song by Selena Gomez from Revival

Other uses
 Cologne (perfume) or Eau de Cologne, a perfume originating from Cologne, Germany, also generically a type of perfume
 Perfume, as a generic term

 Cologne (pigeon), a World War II RAF messenger pigeon
 Cologne phonetics, a phonetic algorithm
 Ford Cologne V6 engine, an automobile engine built in Germany by the Ford Motor Company

See also
 
 Original Eau de Cologne, a geographical indication allowed for 4711, a traditional German Eau de Cologne by Mäurer & Wirtz
 Cologne I (electoral district)
 Cologne II (electoral district)
 Cologne III (electoral district)
 Colón (disambiguation)
 Cologna (disambiguation)
 Cologno (disambiguation)
 Cologny
 Coligny (disambiguation)